Marc-Adélard Tremblay,  (24 April 1922 – 20 March 2014) was a Canadian anthropologist.

Born in Les Éboulements, Quebec, he was educated at Université de Montréal, Université Laval, and Cornell University.

He was a Professor of Anthropology at the Université Laval and was Dean of the Graduate School from 1971 to 1979. From 1981 to 1984, he was the President of the Royal Society of Canada.

In 1980, he was made an Officer of the Order of Canada "in recognition of his important contribution to social anthropology through his research, his many writings and his commitment to community enterprises, to which he has lent his considerable expertise". In 1995, he was made a Grand Officer of the National Order of Quebec.

References

External links
 Marc-Adélard Tremblay at The Canadian Encyclopedia

1922 births
2014 deaths
Canadian anthropologists
Canadian university and college faculty deans
Cornell University alumni
Fellows of the Royal Society of Canada
Grand Officers of the National Order of Quebec
Officers of the Order of Canada
Academic staff of Université Laval
Canadian expatriates in the United States